Hope for Paws is a 501(c)(3) non-profit animal rescue group based in Los Angeles, California. Founded by Eldad and Audrey Hagar in 2008, Hope for Paws rescues animals facing death or danger through abuse or abandonment. They pay for veterinary costs, working with other animal-welfare organizations to find permanent placements for the animals they rescue. 

The organization raises awareness and funding by filming rescue missions and publicizing recoveries of sick animals in their care. With 1.5 billion views on YouTube, and 5 million subscribers, as of 2021 it is estimated that they earn $880,000 per year through videos, in addition to what they receive via donations.

References

External links
 
 Hope For Paws Facebook
 Hope For Paws - Official Rescue Channel on YouTube
 Anderson & Kristin Chenoweth Meet Fiona the Rescue Dog on YouTube

Non-profit organizations based in Los Angeles
Charities based in California
Animal charities based in the United States
Organizations established in 2008
2008 establishments in California